Oh Mabel is a 1924 American animated short film, part of the Song Car-Tunes film series. This film is the first sound film of the series, and used the Phonofilm sound-on-film system. The Song Car-Tunes series, before it ended in September 1926, eventually totaled 36 films, of which 19 were made with sound.

The Fleischer brothers, Lee de Forest, Hugo Riesenfeld, and Edwin Miles Fadiman formed Red Seal Pictures to release the Song Car-Tunes series.

References

External links

Oh Mabel at SilentEra

Phonofilm short films
Short films directed by Dave Fleischer
1924 animated films
1924 films
American silent short films
1920s animated short films
1920s American animated films
American black-and-white films
Fleischer Studios short films